Audubon is a city and the county seat in Audubon County, Iowa, United States. The population was 2,053 in the 2020 census, a decline from 2,382 in the 2000 census.

History
The city is named for John James Audubon the world-famous ornithologist, artist, and painter.

Audubon was laid out by the Chicago, Rock Island and Pacific Railroad, on September 23, 1878. An auction sale of town lots was held on October 15, 1878, with a total sales of $6,190.  The railroad was completed on December 6, 1878, and by December 16, 1878, over fifty houses, a bank, five general stores, one jewelry store, two hotels, one restaurant, three meat markets, three blacksmith shops, one harness shop, one livery stable, two coal yards, two lumber yards, one elevator, three grain dealers, and a school house were built. With the four months of rapid growth in Audubon there was already talk of moving the county seat from Exira which was 13 miles away. In 1879 the railroad built  what was to become the county courthouse and leased it to the county for five years free of cost, in case the county seat was moved to Audubon. In the 1879 general election the vote approved the moving of the county seat to Audubon.

Although the railroad was responsible for starting the town, Ethelbert J. Freeman was the driving force behind the growth of Audubon. Having lived in Exira, Freeman was the agent for the sale of the railroad lands and the town lots and was one of the first people to live in Audubon. Already active in county politics, he became the first mayor of Audubon and was prominent in the incorporation of the town in 1880. Freeman was half owner of the Citizens Bank, chief of the fire department, and became the manager of the waterworks built in 1882 and later manager of the electric light plant when it was built in 1891.

The first postmaster was Arthur L. Sanborn, appointed February 15, 1879. The town post office contains a mural, Audubon's Trip Down the Ohio and Mississippi – 1820, painted in 1942 by Virginia Snedeker. Federally commissioned murals were produced from 1934 to 1943 in the United States through the Section of Painting and Sculpture, later called the Section of Fine Arts, of the Treasury Department. Robert Hunter was the first school teacher from 1878 to 1879. The school keep growing in size and enrollment and by the fall of 1887 the school had eight school rooms, a teaching staff of 10, and 416 pupils enrolled. Audubon was a well-established city by 1900, and growth slowed after that. In 1915 the city was recorded to have a public library, 9 lawyers, 10 medical professionals, 3 veterinarians, 7 clergymen, 4 bankers and many other businesses.

Audubon was a RAGBRAI overnight stop in 1986 and 2006.

Geography
Audubon's longitude and latitude coordinates in decimal form are 41.720323, −94.928422.

Climate

According to the Köppen Climate Classification system, Audubon has a hot-summer humid continental climate, abbreviated "Dfa" on climate maps.

Demographics

2010 census
At the 2010 census there were 2,176 people, 961 households, and 586 families living in the city. The racial makup of the city was 98.9% White, 0.2% African American, 0.3% Native American, 0.2% Asian, and 0.3% from two or more races. Hispanic or Latino of any race were 0.7%.

Of the 961 households 26.0% had children under the age of 18 living with them, 48.4% were married couples living together, 8.5% had a female householder with no husband present, 4.1% had a male householder with no wife present, and 39.0% were non-families. 36.6% of households were one person and 22% were one person aged 65 or older. The average household size was 2.18 and the average family size was 2.82.

The median age was 47.5 years. 21.9% of residents were under the age of 18; 5.4% were between the ages of 18 and 24; 19.5% were from 25 to 44; 24.6% were from 45 to 64; and 28.5% were 65 or older. The gender makeup of the city was 46.5% male and 53.5% female.

2000 census
At the 2000 census there were 2,382 people, 1,035 households, and 646 families living in the city. The racial makup of the city was 99.33% White, 0.25% African American, and 0.42% from two or more races. Hispanic or Latino of any race were 0.34%.

Of the 1,035 households 24.9% had children under the age of 18 living with them, 54.0% were married couples living together, 6.9% had a female householder with no husband present, and 37.5% were non-families. 36.0% of households were one person and 23.1% were one person aged 65 or older. The average household size was 2.18 and the average family size was 2.83.

Age spread: 22.8% under the age of 18, 4.9% from 18 to 24, 20.8% from 25 to 44, 20.2% from 45 to 64, and 31.3% 65 or older. The median age was 46 years. For every 100 females, there were 82.0 males. For every 100 females age 18 and over, there were 76.9 males.

The median household income was $33,068 and the median family income  was $40,455. Males had a median income of $31,071 versus $19,183 for females. The per capita income for the city was $20,128. About 5.9% of families and 6.7% of the population were below the poverty line, including 6.9% of those under age 18 and 7.1% of those age 65 or over.

Arts and culture

Annual events
John James Audubon festival in April, in honor of the town's namesake.
"Operation T-bone", in August, with a variety of events including the T-Bone feeders' auction.

Landmarks

Notable people

Elmer Carlson (1909–2005) Cornhusking champion and company founder
William R. Green (1856–1947) U.S. Representative from Iowa's 9th congressional district for nine terms
Harold R. Kaufman (1926–2018) Award-winning American physicist, professor, and patent holder
Charles Taylor Manatt (1936–2011) Chairman of the Democratic National Committee 1981–85
C. W. McCall is the pseudonym of William Dale Fries, Jr. (1928–2022) an advertising executive and singer, best known for the song Convoy. McCall recorded a song about his hometown, "Audubon", in 1975.
Harriet Spanel (1939-2016), Washington state legislator and community volunteer

See also

T-Bone Trail

Notes

References

External links

City tourism page

Cities in Audubon County, Iowa
Cities in Iowa
County seats in Iowa
1878 establishments in Iowa
Populated places established in 1878